Mehrdad Akhavan, better known by his stage name Mehrdad Asemani (was born July 16, 1967, in Tehran, Iran) is an Iranian singer, composer and musician. He lives in Los Angeles.

Biography 
Mehrdad Asemani was born in Tehran and spent his childhood in Hafez Street (Sanglej). He went to Hadaf Junior High and graduated from Hadaf High School. Despite being accepted to university, he enlisted for military service and served for 27 months in the Iran-Iraq War. While attending school, he learned music and singing techniques from masters in these fields in Iran.

When he realized he could not freely pursue his singing career in Iran, he left Iran in 1992 for Los Angeles. While in Los Angeles, Asemani released his first album, "Voice of Sun," which became an instant hit, becoming famous in the Persian community worldwide. With his second album called, "Pooste Shab," he became a household name in the Persian community.

Asemani has also written many songs for other famous Persian singers living in California. Many of his songs are about Iran. In one of his albums called "Ghazal", Asemani sings a song, Mahak, for his child “Mehrzad.” Mehrdad loves and adores his family and believes loving family is like loving God.

Asemani's talent in making music brought him together with the Persian Diva "Googoosh", whom he worked with on her album "Q, Q Bang Bang".

Leaving Iran 
While in school, in addition to his primary studies, Asemani studied music with art professors. After performing several songs for Iranian radio and television, he needed to improve in independent artistic activities.

A year and a half later, Asemani achieved fame with the release of the album "Night Skin" and the famous song "Chador" (Chador Nendaz Saret) with lyrics by Masoud Amini and a song by Hassan Shamaeizadeh. Mohammad Saleh Ala and Masoud Amini composed the songs performed in their first albums. After these two albums and performing a concert in Los Angeles, Mehrdad Asemani held concerts in different cities in America and Europe in 1999. He married Ghazaleh in 2000 and had two sons, Mehrzad and Mahan. They separated in 2010. In 2019, Asemani married Shiva Rahimi and had a son named Milan.

Artistic activity

Composing for other singers 
In addition to composing for himself, Asemani has collaborated with other Iranian singers.

Asemani worked with Googoosh, Shohreh Solati, Nooshafarin, Sattar, Mahasti, Shahram Shabpareh, Leila Forouhar, Shahram Solati, Toka, Behzad, Farrokh Turkzadeh, Nahid, Sheila, Susan Roshan, Mansour, Fataneh, Saman and Arman.

Asemani has collaborated with famous songwriters such as Iraj Janati Atai, Masoud Amini, Mohammad Saleh Ala, Shahyar Ghanbari, Homayoun Houshiarnejad, Masoud Fardmanesh, Zoya Zakarian, and Jacqueline, and with composers such as Jahanbakhsh Pazooki, Siavash Ghomayshi, Hassan Shamaeizadeh, Manouchehr Cheshmazar and Babak Bayat.

Collaboration with Googoosh 
The first collaboration was the song QQ Bang Bang with a poem by Zoya Zakarian and arranged by Manouchehr Cheshmazar, which was about 13 minutes long. This collaboration continued in the album Last News in 2003. Mehrdad Asemani composed all the songs in this album (except Pir Mashrekh). The songs of this album were written by Shahyar Ghanbari and Zoya Zakarian, with arrangements by Mehrdad Asemani, Andy J, and Manouchehr Cheshmazar, who performed the song Last News in two voices in this album. Googoosh appeared as a guest singer in Mehrdad's snapshot album and performed three songs with Mehrdad in two voices. Afterward, Mehrdad appeared in the next album of Googoosh, Mehrdad's Manifest, as a composer and arranger with songs by Shahyar Ghanbari. He also performed the song of birth certificate in two voices with Googoosh; in 2008, after three years of silence, they jointly released the album Shab Speid, which received much attention.

Collaboration with Shohreh Solati 
Most of Mehrdad's songs (after Googoosh) were performed by Shohreh Solati, including 14 songs, 4 of which are unreleased. Among the most successful songs of this collaboration is "Payam", with lyrics by Masoud Fardmanesh and arranged by Manouchehr Cheshmazar, and the song "Naamee", with music by Masoud Fardmanesh and arranged by Amir Badakhsh. Mehrdad performed part of this two-voice song. Mehrdad's collaboration with Shohreh was not limited to composing and singing; the two went around the world together to perform a tour in Europe and America.

Cooperation with Sattar and Mahasti 
This collaboration was released as an album called Gol Gandam, jointly with Sattar and Mahasti. Mehrdad and lyrics wrote all the songs of this album by Alireza Meibodi, Homayoun Hoshiar Nejad, and Masoud Amini, arranged by Manouchehr Cheshmazar, Schubert. Avakian and Saeed Ghorbani, published in 1998, in which Mahasti and Sattar performed a two-part song called Booye Noon, Booye Khak, and Booye Gandom.

Mehrdad Asemani albums

The voice of the sun 
This album was recorded underground in Iran and released in Los Angeles.

Night skin

References

External links 

1967 births
Living people
Iranian composers
People from Tehran
Iranian pop singers
Iranian male singers
Persian-language singers
American people of Iranian descent
Iranian people of the Iran–Iraq War
Military personnel of the Iran–Iraq War
Iranian expatriates in the United States
Iranian military personnel of the Iran–Iraq War